Antipas can refer to:

 Herod Antipas, an ancient ruler of Galilee and Perea
 Antipater the Idumaean, the founder of the Herodian Dynasty, father of Herod the Great, and grandfather of Herod Antipas
 Antipas of Pergamum, martyred bishop of the early Christian Church, referred to in the Biblical book of Revelation
 Antipas, Cotabato, a municipality in the Philippines
 Mount Antipas, a place mentioned in the Book of Mormon
 Antipas (tribe), one of several Jivaroan peoples indigenous to the upper Amazon
 Antipas (Millennium), a third-season episode of Millennium

See also
 Antipater (disambiguation)